Ample Hills is an American ice cream company. Founded by Brian Smith and Jackie Cuscuna as a pushcart in 2010, the company became known for its "playful" flavors and expanded into a chain prominent in New York City and with additional locations in Florida. Their first storefront, in Prospect Heights, Brooklyn, opened in 2011, selling out 130 gallons of ice cream in just 4 days. A Los Angeles location closed after 15 months. The company filed for bankruptcy in March 2020 prior to the COVID-19 pandemic due to operating losses from its Red Hook factory. Schmitt Industries acquired Ample Hills from bankruptcy for $1 million. The founders signed a lease to open a new ice cream company and shop, the Social, in March 2021. Ample Hills closed permanently on December 19th 2022.

References

Further reading 

 
 
 
 
 
 
 
 
 

2010 establishments in New York City
American companies established in 2010
Ice cream brands
Companies that filed for Chapter 11 bankruptcy in 2020